Baillères is a surname. Notable people with the surname include:

Alberto Baillères (1931–2022), Mexican billionaire businessman
Alejandro Baillères (born 1960), Mexican businessman
Raúl Baillères (1895–1967), Mexican businessman